Gerrards Cross Golf Club is a golf club, located at Chalfont Park in Chalfont St Peter, Buckinghamshire, England. It was established in 1922.

References

Golf clubs and courses in Buckinghamshire
1922 establishments in England
Gerrards Cross